Geraldine DeRuiter is an American author and blogger at Everywhereist.

Time magazine named Everywhereist one of their blogs of the year in 2011, and her memoir, All Over the Place, was published in 2017.

References

American non-fiction writers
American bloggers
Year of birth missing (living people)
Living people